Rhostyllen Victoria was a Welsh football club based in Rhostyllen, Wrexham during the Victorian era.

History

League History
They played in the Welsh Senior League from 1890–1897

Cup History

Notable players
  Alf Pugh Achieved International honours as a Rhostyllen Victoria player, also first ever person to be substituted in an International football match.
  Bill Roberts Achieved International honours.

Other Notes
Listed as having striped jerseys in 1889, exact colours are unknown. Source from 1885 lists them as playing in white shirts.

References

Sources

Defunct football clubs in Wales
Sport in Wrexham
Sport in Wrexham County Borough
Football clubs in Wrexham